Ćirić is a Serbian surname. It may refer to:

Aleksandar Ćirić (born 1977), Serbian water polo player
Dragan Ćirić (born 1974), Serbian retired footballer who played as a midfielder
Milovan Ćirić (1918–1986), Serbian football (soccer) coach and also former player
Nikola Ćirić (born 1983), Serbian tennis player
Saša Ćirić (born 1968), former football player from the Republic of Macedonia of Serbian origin
Zoran Ćirić (born 1962), writer from Niš, Serbia

See also
Ciric (river), tributary of the river Bahlui in Romania

Serbian surnames